Juan Manuel López Mella (12 April 1965 – 10 May 1995) was a Spanish professional Grand Prix and Superbike motorcycle racer. After coming second in the national championships in 1985, he entered international competitions for the first time in 1987. He was the first person from Galicia to enter the competition. He came third in the 1991 Spanish Superbike race at Jarama, the first person from Spain to gain a podium position in the competition, and was named Spanish Superbike champion in both 1991 and 1992, becoming the highest placed private rider overall in 1993. In 1995, he started riding in the Thunderbike tournament but was killed in a road accident early in the season. Lugo, his city of birth, has named a park that teaches road safety in his honour and hosts a museum in his memory.

Motorcycling career
Born on 12 April 1965 in Lugo in Galacia, Spain, Juan Manuel López Mella started his racing career with motocross but by the age of 18 had moved to racing asphalt. After debuting nationally in the Criterium Solo Moto in 1985, and coming second overall in the junior category of the 250cc class that year, he then progressed to racing in the World Motorcycle Championships in 1987. He became the first Galacian to compete in a world championship. After a season riding a Yamaha TZ250, during which he scored no points, he moved to a Honda RS250R in 1988; once again he finished outside the championship rankings. At that stage, he decided to move to larger bikes.

In 1989, López Mella raced for the first time in the 500cc category of the World Motorcycle Championship, with a Honda NS500. He was the first Galacian to compete in the championship, placing at number 40 at the end of the season. Between 1990 and 1992, he competed in the Superbike World Championship, finishing with 33 starts and 99 points over the three seasons. During the 1991 season, he achieved his sole podium placing when he came third in the Spanish round at Jarama with a time of 40:05.859. López Mella was the first Spaniard to achieve a podium place in the championship. He was also the first to cross the finish line in a four-stroke bike at the Superprestigio Super Moto at the Circuit de Barcelona-Catalunya later the that year. He subsequently competed twice in the 1992 Superbike World Championship, coming thirteenth both times. He was named Spanish Superbike champion in both 1991 and 1992.

In 1992, he re-entered in the Grand Prix 500cc class with a Yamaha YZR500. However, in that year his funding ran out; it was only fund-raising by his now substantial fan base that enabled him to continue to compete. Riding for his own Lopez Mella Racing Team, he entered both the 1993 and 1994 seasons. In 1993, he came twelfth overall, the highest placed amongst the privately sponsored riders. In 1994, he replaced Kevin Schwantz in the Suzuki team for the European Grand Prix at Circuit de Barcelona-Catalunya. He came thirteenth riding a Suzuki RGV500.

Death and legacy
In 1995, López Mella started the season racing in the Thunderbike Trophy, completing the first race at Jerez de la Frontera in fourth place. He expected to complete the year with a good overall score, possibly with a podium position. However, on the evening of 10 May, while riding near Albacete on his way to train at the Circuit de Calafat, his motorbike hit a puddle of water, left the road and crashed. An ambulance was called to take him to the hospital but he died before arriving. His riding companion and girlfriend, Cristina Blanco Trinidad, was also injured but survived. In his honour, Lugo named a park in his name, which opened on 26 May 1995. The park teaches road safety to children. The city also hosts a museum that was created in his memory.

Career statistics

Grand Prix motorcycle racing

Races by year
(key) (Races in bold indicate pole position)

Superbike World Championship

Races by year
(key) (Races in bold indicate pole position) (Races in italics indicate fastest lap)

References

1965 births
500cc World Championship riders
Sportspeople from Lugo
Spanish motorcycle racers
250cc World Championship riders
1995 deaths
Superbike World Championship riders